Trevignano is a town and comune in the province of Treviso, Veneto, Italy. It is a scattered municipality as the municipal seat is not located in the locality of the same name but in nearby Falzè.

Origins of the name
The toponym is a predial from the personal Trebinius to which the suffix -ānus has been added.'

Monuments and places of interest

Religious architecture
Parish Church of San Teonisto e Compagni Martiri

Civil architectures

Venetian villas
Villa Bruna
Villa Cadò
Valentine's Cooperative
Villa Coletti
Casa Coletti Previero
Villa Favaretto
Villa Manin
Annex of Villa Onigo
Villa Onigo Farra
Villa Onigo Pasinetti Favotto
Villa Onigo Rinaldi Ninni
Villa Palladini Coletti Pumini
Villa Pasqualetti Oniga
Pizzolato house

Geography
The municipality borders with Istrana, Montebelluna, Paese, Vedelago and Volpago del Montello.

The commune contains the town of Trevignano and the hamlets of Signoressa, Musano and Falzé (listed in order of population size).

Two provincial roads cross the entire municipal territory in an east-west direction (SP 69 Schiavonesca) and north-south (SP 100 of Montebelluna). 

The statute recognizes 4 geographical fractions:
Trevignano is located on the SP 69, in the western part of the municipal area;
Falzè (town hall) is located at the crossroads of the aforementioned road with the SP 100;
Signoressa is contiguous to Falzè, always on the SP 69 in an easterly direction;
Musano is instead to the south, along the SP 100.

Demographic evolution

Foreign ethnicities and minorities 
The largest groups are shown below:
 China 
 Romania 
 Morocco 
 Kosovo 
 Albania 
 Ghana 
 Ukraine 
 Moldova

Economy

Agriculture continues to be practiced successfully thanks to the favorable characteristics of the land: cereals, wheat, vegetables, fodder, vines and orchards are grown. Breeding is also practiced, especially of cattle, pigs, sheep and poultry. The industrial fabric is mainly made up of shoe factories, for example the well-known Lotto and Stonefly. There are also establishments for processing and preserving fruit and vegetables, dairy farms, feed mills and various construction companies. The tertiary sector is made up of the distribution network (supermarkets) and the set of services, including that of a large banking group in the historic centre.

References

External links

  Official site